Antispila merinaella is a moth of the family Heliozelidae. It was described by Paulian and Viette in 1955. It is found on Madagascar.

References

Moths described in 1955
Heliozelidae